Róbert Oravec (born 7 October 1996) is a Slovak football midfielder who currently plays for FC Nitra.

References

1994 births
Living people
Association football midfielders
Slovak footballers
FC Nitra players
Slovak Super Liga players